Sthānakavāsī is a sect of Śvētāmbara Jainism. It believes that idol worship is not essential in the path of soul purification and attainment of Nirvana/Moksha. Sthānakavāsī accept thirty-two of the Jain Agamas, the Svetambara canon.

Saints

Saints (ascetic Sthanakvasins, called maharaj saheb's) wear white clothes and cover their mouths with a square white cloth or muhapatti intended to minimize the risk of inhaling small insects or other airborne life forms, which Sthanakvasins see as a violation of ahimsa "non-violence". They eat food collected from followers' houses and do not save edibles beyond the next meal and water is not kept even for a single night. All eating and drinking has to be done between sunrise and sunset.

Saints do not stay at one place for too long except for the four monsoon months, the chaturmas. Saints are also called dhundhiya "searchers" for their early practice of searching out and staying in abandoned or neglected structures to avoid disturbance from the public. Saints own no possessions except for a few books, a couple sets of clothes and carrying utensils made of a special natural material.

Sthanakwasi : The Sthanakwasi arose not directly from the Shwetambars but as reformers of an older reforming sect, viz., the Lonka sect of Jainism. This Lonka sect was founded in about 1474 A.D. by Lonkashah, a rich and well-read merchant of Ahmedabad.

The main principle of this sect was not to practice idol-worship. Later on, some of the members of the Lonka sect disapproved of the ways of life of their current ascetics, declaring that they lived less strictly than Mahavira would have wished. A Lonka sect layman, Viraji of Surat, received initiation as a Yati, i.e., an ascetic, and won great admiration on account of the strictness of his life. Many people of the Lonka sect joined this reformer and they took the name of Sthanakwasi, thereby intending to strictly follow on the principles of Lord Mahavir. Sthanakvasi means those who do not have their religious activities in temples but carry on their religious duties in places known as Sthanakas which are like prayer-halls.

The Sthanakwasis are also called by terms as

(a) Dhundhiya (searchers) or

(b) Sadhumargi (followers of Sadhus i.e., ascetics)

Except on the crucial point of idol-worship, Sthanakwasi do not differ much from other Shwetambar Jains and hence now-a-days they invariably call themselves as Shwetambar Sthanakwasi. However, there are some differences between the Sthanakwasi and the Murtipujak Shwetambars in the observance of some religious practices. The Sthanakwasi do not believe in idol-worship at all. As such they do not have temples but only sthanakas, that is, prayer halls, where they carry on their religious fasts, festivals, practices, prayers, discourses, etc.

Further, the ascetics of Sthanakwasi cover their mouths with strips of cloth for all the time and they do not use the cloth of yellow or any other colour (of course, except white). Moreover, the Sthanakwasi admit the authenticity of only 32 of the scriptures of Shwetambars. Furthermore, the Sthanakwasis do not participate in the religious festivals (that related to temples and idol worship) of Murtipujak Shwetambars.

Subsects

There are several organized sub-sects in Shwetambar Sthankawasi order.  The Shwetambar Sthanakwasi are also spread in different business centers in India but they are found mainly in Rajasthan, Gujarat, Maharashtra, Punjab, Haryana, Karnataka and Tamil Nadu.

The two non-idolatrous sub-sects, viz., Taranapanthis among the Digambars and Shwetambar Sthanakwasi among the Shwetambar Murtipujak, came very late in the history of the Jain.

About 1474 A.D. the Lonka sect, the first of the non-idolatrous Jain sects, arose and was followed by the Dhundhiya or Sthanakwasi sect about 1653 A.D. dates which coincide strikingly with the Lutheran and Puritan movements in Europe.

Shraman Sangh 

Shraman Sangh of Sthanakvasi sect was formed at a convocation in Sadri, Rajasthan in 1952 to unite all the sub-sects under one acharya. This is the largest Sthanakvasi group.

Acharya Atmaramji was the first acharya from 1952 to 1962 and Acharya Anand Rishiji (1900-1992) was the second acharya from 1964 to 1992. Acharya Devendra Muni Ji(1931 - 1999) was the Third acharya from 1992 to 1999. Acharya Shiv Muni who is the current Acharya of Shraman sangh has regularly travelled all over India to impart the values of Jainism.

Sadhumargi Sangh

After all the small breakaways from the Sangh, Acharya Hukmi ChandJi Mahraj Saheb came up to establish the Sadhumargi Jain Sangh and can be considered to be actual descendents of the initial Sangh.  He was followed by 6 more Acharyas, followed by one of the most prominent Shri Nanalal Ji Maharaj Saheb, who held the position in early 1980s. He was followed by the present Acharya, Shri Ramlal Ji Maharaj Saheb, who has been most graciously following the path of Mahavira till now.

Shanti Kranti Sangh 

In the nineties,  the black clouds of falsehood, immorality and unrest were looming large on the horizon of Sadhumargi Jain Sangh.At last, the sages fixed the aim of interviewing the truth by refining the laxity of conduct.

On May 22, 1997, a historic conch shell was made for the establishment of Chaturvid Sangh on the land of Mandsaur, known as Dashpur. Shraman Shrestha Shanti Muni Ji Maharaj Saheb the occasion of Chikarda Holi Chaturmas, Sthavir Pramukh Shri Vijay Muni Ji Maharaj Saheb was given  the post of "Sangh Nayak", "Tarunacharya". On October 27, 1999, with the death of Acharya Shri Nanesh, Tarunacharya Shri Vijay Raj Ji Maharaj Saheb became the Acharya of Shanti Kranti Sadhumargi Sangh.

Notes

References

Śvētāmbara sects
Jainism